Harald Juhnke (born Harry Heinz Herbert Juhnke, 10 June 1929 – 1 April 2005), was a German actor, comedian, and singer.

Life and career

Juhnke was born in Berlin-Charlottenburg. His father was a police officer and his mother came from a family of bakers. He grew up in the working-class district of Gesundbrunnen in Berlin.

His first stage appearance was in 1948. In 1950, he was hired by the theater in Neustrelitz. In the following years, he worked in several other theaters, including the Volksbühne in Berlin.

Juhnke began appearing on German television after 1977. He played in a number of television series and later hosted the ZDF television show Musik ist Trumpf. He often sang on the shows he hosted, in particular emulating Frank Sinatra. Juhnke went on to record several albums between the years 1968 and 1999.

In 1992, Juhnke experienced a comeback as a film actor. He won praise from critics for character parts in the movies Schtonk!, and Der Hauptmann von Köpenick. In 1995, he played the lead role in the movie , based on the autobiography of German writer Hans Fallada. 

His first marriage was to actress and dancer Sybil Werden. The couple had two children: their daughter Barbara was born in 1953 and in 1956, they had a son, Peer. In 1971, Juhnke married actress . They had a son, Oliver Marlon, who was born in 1972.

In February 2005, Harald Juhnke was hospitalized with acute dehydration. He died in Rüdersdorf, near Berlin, at the age of 75.

Awards
 1978: Goldener Vorhang award of Berlin's Theaterclub
 1980: Goldene Kamera
 1990: Goldene Europa – Honored as an entertainer of the 1980s and 1990s
 1992: Deutscher Filmpreis
 1992: Bambi Award
 1993: Ernst Lubitsch Preis
 1993: Bayerischer Fernsehpreis
 1993: Karl Valentin Order
 1993: Romy – Television actor of the year
 1995: Critic's Award of the Berliner Zeitung for lifetime accomplishment
 1996: Telestar
 1998: Goldener Löwe (RTL)
 2000: Goldene Kamera

Selected filmography

 Three Girls Spinning (1950) – Pastor Krempel
 The Blue Hour (1953) – Fred
 Hit Parade (1953) – Alfred
 The Dancing Heart (1953) – Julius
 The Stronger Woman (1953) – Bob
 Guitars of Love (1954) – Walter
 Doctor Solm (1955) – Konrad, Solm's stepbrother
 How Do I Become a Film Star? (1955) – Günther Scholz
 Heroism after Hours (1955) – Burmann 
 Request Concert (1955) – Horn
 When the Alpine Roses Bloom (1955) – Lenz
 Your Life Guards (1955) – Hansen
 The Model Husband (1956) – Billy Haber
 Beneath the Palms on the Blue Sea (1957) – Freddy Glass
 Greetings and Kisses from Tegernsee (1957) – Billy
 The Mad Bomberg (1957) – Dr. Roland
 Almenrausch and Edelweiss (1957) – Max Lachner
 The Green Devils of Monte Cassino (1958) – Hugo Lembke
 U 47 – Kapitänleutnant Prien (1958) – The Smut
 La Paloma (1959) – Peter
 Hula-Hopp, Conny (1959) — Dr. Robert Berning
 A Thousand Stars Aglitter (1959) – Axel Grenner Jr.
 I Learned That in Paris (1960) – Mathias Mai, layer
 Do Not Send Your Wife to Italy (1960) – Karl Beetz
 The Last Witness (1960) – Criminal secretary Wenzel
  (1961) – Jochen
 What Is Father Doing in Italy? (1961) – Mr. Akaschian
 Isola Bella (1961) – Anton
 The Sold Grandfather (1962) – Max Krause
 Das Testament des Dr. Mabuse (1962) – Assistant detective Krüger
 Golden Goddess of Rio Beni (1964) – Tom
 Red Dragon (1965) – Smoky
 Die Letzten drei der Albatross (1965) – Kuddel Lehmann
 The Murderer with the Silk Scarf (1966) – Chief Inspector Charly Fischer
 Hurra, die Schule brennt! (1969) – Speaker
 Der Kommissar (1970, TV series) – Gerhard Diebach
 Auch ich war nur ein mittelmäßiger Schüler (1974) – Arzt
 Sergeant Berry (1975, TV series) – Sergeant Albert Berry
 Derrick (1976, TV series) – Prinx
 Ein verrücktes Paar (1977–1980, TV series) – Harald
  (1978, TV series) – Franz Wagenseil
 Leute wie du und ich (1980–1984, TV series) – Harald
  (1982, TV movie) – Philipe Bernard
  (1984) – Sigi Stenz
  (1987–1990, TV series)
  (1990) – Henne
 Schtonk! (1992) – Kummer
  (1992) – Dieter "Did" Stricker
 Back to Square One (1994) – Georg Kuballa
 Asterix Conquers America (1994) – Narrator (German version, voice)
  (1995, TV Movie) – Erwin Sommer
 Conversation with the Beast (1996) – Hitler double
 Der Hauptmann von Köpenick (1997, TV movie) – Wilhelm Voigt

Discography

Studio albums
 Mit beiden Händen in den Taschen (1968)
 Aber vor allem würde ich trinken! (1976)
 Ein Mann für alle Fälle (1979)
 Harald Juhnke (1981)
 Schuld sind nur die Frau'n (1982)
 Goodbye Madame (1983)
 Barfuß oder Lackschuh (1989)
 Manchmal ein Clown sein (1992)
 His Way (1998)
 That's life (1999)

Live albums
 Tonight Harald (1984)
 My Way – Das Beste (1995)

References

External links

 
 

1929 births
2005 deaths
Male actors from Berlin
German male comedians
German male stage actors
German male film actors
German male television actors
20th-century German male actors
20th-century comedians
ZDF people
People from Mitte